Douglas James Reid (born 17 October 1928) is a former cricketer who played seven matches of first-class cricket for Canterbury in New Zealand from 1953 to 1957. A left-arm opening bowler, Reid's best performance was 4 for 58 against Otago in 1953–54.

Reid and his wife Toni Reid (the daughter of the All Black Read Masters) both represented Canterbury in cricket in the 1950s. They married in Merivale, Christchurch, in February 1954. On the death of Bill Crump on 10 July 2022, Reid became the oldest living New Zealand first-class cricketer.

References

External links
 
 

1928 births
Living people
Cricketers from Christchurch
New Zealand cricketers
Canterbury cricketers